Sinotrans Changhang, or Sinotrans&CSC Holdings, is the largest logistics company of the People's Republic of China, with further interests in shipping and shipbuilding. The group is state-owned and was formed in March 2009 by the reorganisation of two other state-owned enterprises, the China National Foreign Trade Transportation (Group) Corporation (Sinotrans) and the China Changjiang National Shipping (Group) Corporation (CSC).

In December 2015 the State Council gave its approval for a further strategic reorganisation as part of a wider drive to improve the vitality and competitiveness of state-owned corporations. This entailed the integration of Sinotrans Changhang into the China Merchants Group, a process which was completed by April 2017.

References

Shipping companies of China
Logistics companies of China
Government-owned companies of China
2008 establishments in China